François Delpla (born 1948)  is a French historian. He is a specialist in the history of World War II and the French Resistance. He was one of the contributors to the Black Book of Capitalism.

He received a doctorate  in 2002 from the  Université Panthéon-Sorbonne (Paris) for a thesis "Décision et décideurs français et britanniques de la chute de Daladier aux lendemains de Montoire (mars-novembre 1940)" under the direction of Jean-Claude Allain

Books

History
 Les Papiers secrets du général Doumenc (1939-1940), Olivier Orban, Paris, 1991, 526 p.
 Montoire – Les premiers jours de la collaboration, Albin Michel, Paris, 1996, 504 p. ( et 978-2226084880)  
review, Vingtième Siècle. Revue d'histoire, n52 (19961001): 160
review, Guerres mondiales et conflits contemporains, n220 (20051001): 141-147
 La Ruse nazie – Dunkerque - 24 mai 1940, Éditions France Empire, 1997, 310 p. ( et 978-2704808144)  
 Aubrac – Les faits et la calomnie, Le Temps des Cerises, 1998, 171 p. ( et 978-2841091133).
 Hitler, Grasset, Paris, 1999, 541 p. ( et 978-2246570417).  
 L'Appel du 18 Juin 1940, Grasset, Paris, 2000, 314 p. ( et 978-2246599319).
 La Face cachée de 1940 – Comment Churchill réussit à prolonger la partie, Éditions François-Xavier de Guibert, coll. « Histoire », 2003, 191 p. ( et 978-2868398413) [
 (with Jacques Baumel), La Libération de la France, L'Archipel, Paris, 2004, 192 p. ( et 978-2841874217) [
 Les Tentatrices du diable – Hitler, la part des femmes, L'Archipel, Paris, 2005, 361 p. ( et 978-2841876839) [ 
 Nuremberg face à l'histoire, L'Archipel, Paris, 2006, 350 p. ( et 978-2841877812) 
 (with Jacques Baumelel), Un Tragique Malentendu : de Gaulle et l'Algérie, Plon, Paris, 2006, 250 p. ( et 978-2259204125) 
review,  Esprit (1940-) n330 (12) (20061201): 221
 Qui a tué Georges Mandel ? (1885-1944), L'Archipel, Paris, 2008, 427 p. ( et 978-2-8098-0075-3).
 Petit Dictionnaire énervé de la Seconde Guerre mondiale, collection « Petit dictionnaire énervé », L'Opportun, Paris, 2010, 217 p. ( et 978-2360750054).
 Mers el-Kébir, 3 juillet 1940 : l'Angleterre rentre en guerre Paris : Guibert, 2010.
 Hitler – 30 janvier 1933 – La Véritable Histoire, Saint-Malo, Éditions Pascal Galodé, 2013, 224 p.. U
 Une histoire du Troisième Reich, Éditions Perrin, 2014, 450 p..
 Hitler – Propos intimes et politiques (1941-1942), tome I, Nouveau Monde Éditions, 2016.

Fiction

References

External links
His website

Living people
20th-century French historians
French male non-fiction writers
1948 births
21st-century French historians